Federal Highway 134 (Carretera Federal 134) is a Federal Highway of Mexico. The highway travels from Naucalpan, State of Mexico in the northeast to Zihuatanejo, Guerrero in the southwest. It crosses 3 states. State of Mexico, Michoacan and Guerrero.

References

External links
Bear's 'Highway 134' Mexico page

134